Lasku or Lesku, also rendered as or Laskooh, may refer to:
 Lasku Kalayeh
 Lasku Kalayeh-ye Lab-e Darya